B.K. Hariprasad (born 29 July 1954) is a politician from the Indian National Congress party. He is a former Member of Parliament who represented Karnataka in the Rajya Sabha, the upper house of the Indian Parliament. He was the candidate of the United Opposition for the post of Deputy Chairman of the Rajya Sabha and lost to Shri Harivansh Narayan Singh of NDA.

Early life
Hariprasad was born in Bangalore, Karnataka, to A. Kempaiah and K. Gunavathi in the south Kalwar family. He did his B.Com. at M.E.S. College, Bangalore University, Bangalore.

Political career
Hariprasad is a member of the Rajya Sabha. He is also a General Secretary of the All India Congress Committee. He lost the election to Ananthkumar of BJP in Bangalore South. He is currently incharge general secretary of Odisha, Jharkhand & Chhattisgarh for upcoming assembly elections there.
In 1999, Hariprasad contested unsuccessfully against Kumar.

General Election 1999

Indian general election, 1999: Bangalore South Party 	Candidate 	Votes 	% 	±
	BJP 	 	Ananth Kumar 	 	4,10,161 	50.99 	
	INC 	 	B. K. Hariprasad 	3,44,107 	42.78 	
	JD(S) 	 	B. T. Parthasarathy 	22,801 	 	2.83 	
	AIADMK 	 	D. Arumugam 	 	11,643 	 	1.45 	
	Independent 	Dr. B. R. Manjunath 	11,636 	 	1.45 	
	Majority 	 	 	 	66,054 	 	8.21 	
	Turnout 	 	 	 	8,04,342 	54.08 	
	BJP hold 	Swing

Personal life
Hariprasad is married to Usha and they have a daughter.

External links
 Detailed Profile: Shri B.K. Hariprasad

References

1954 births
Living people
Indian National Congress politicians from Karnataka
Politicians from Bangalore
Rajya Sabha members from Karnataka